Gasnier is a surname, originally Garnier. Notable people with the surname include:

 Louis J. Gasnier (1875-1963), French film director
 Julie Estelle Gasnier (born 1989), Indonesian actress
 Mark Gasnier (born 1981), Australian rugby league player, nephew of Reg
 Reg Gasnier (born 1939), Australian rugby league player